Akbük is a small holiday resort on a bay in the Aegean Region near Didim and with a permanent population of 4,000 and a summer population of 50,000. It was bounded to Milas district in Muğla Province before being moved to the Didim district in Aydın Province in 1991. It has a municipality since 1991.

Akbük is served by Milas–Bodrum Airport, which is approximately 60 km away, and Adnan Menderes Airport in İzmir, which is approximately 140 km away.

In April 2014 Akbük council (belediye) was disbanded as the town came under the jurisdiction of Didim as a result of re-zoning.

Akbük continues to be predominantly a holiday resort for Turkish people with around 60,000 visitors in the summer, most of whom own property in the town. The expansion of hotels and holiday complex sites in the area has led to an increase of foreign visitors from Europe and Russia.

In addition to Turkish, English and German are widely spoken as well.

Populated places in Aydın Province
Fishing communities in Turkey
Didim District
Towns in Turkey